Malvanlu (also Romanized as Malvānlū) is a village in Jirestan Rural District, Sarhad District, Shirvan County, North Khorasan Province, Iran. At the 2006 census, its population was 543, in 102 families.

References 

Populated places in Shirvan County